Saraya is a small town with commune status in south-east Senegal. It is the chief settlement of  Saraya Department in Kédougou Region.  

In 2013 its population was recorded at 2,726.

References

Populated places in Kédougou Region
Communes of Senegal